Melvin is a masculine given name and surname, likely a variant of Melville and a descendant of the French surname de Maleuin and the later Melwin. It may alternatively be spelled as Melvyn or, in Welsh, Melfyn and the name Melivinia or Melva may be used a feminine form. Of Norman French origin, originally Malleville, which translates to "bad town," it likely made its way into usage in Scotland as a result of the Norman conquest of England. It came into use as a given name as early as the 19th century, in English-speaking populations.

As a name

Given name

Academics

Melvin Calvin (1911–1997), American chemist who discovered the Calvin cycle
Melvin Day (1923–2016), New Zealand artist and art historian
Melvin Hochster (born 1943), American mathematician
Melvin Konner (born 1946), Professor of Anthropology
Melvin Schwartz (1932–2006), American physicist who won the Nobel Prize in Physics in 1988
Melvin Alvah Traylor, Jr. (1915–2008), American ornithologist

Businessmen

Melvin Jones (1879-1961), businessman and founder of Lions Club
Melvin Alvah Traylor (born 1878), American banker
Melvin T. Tukman, American asset manager, investor, philanthropist.

Performers

Melvin Edmonds, member of R&B group After 7
Melvin Franklin (1942–1995), stage name of American bass singer David Melvin English
Melvin Gibbs, American bass guitarist
Melvin Odoom (born 1980), English comedian and presenter
 Melvin Kaminsky (born 1926), given name of actor Mel Brooks
Melvin Parker (1944–2021), American drummer who played in James Brown's band
Melvin Van Peebles (1932–2021), American actor and director
Melvin Ragin (1951–2018), American guitarist known as 'Wah-Wah Watson'
Melvin Rhyne (1936–2013), jazz organist
Melvin Seals (born 1953), American musician
Melvin Sia (born 1979), Malaysian-Chinese actor, singer, model
Melvin Sparks (1946–2011), American jazz guitarist

Politicians

Melvin Irvin (1942-2014), African-American politician
Melvin R. Laird, Sr. (1877-1946), American politician
Melvin R. Laird (1922-2016), American politician and writer
Melvin Maas (1898–1964), U.S. Representative from Minnesota
Melvin J. Miller (1919-1974), American farmer and politician
Melvin McQuaid (1911–2001), member of the Canadian House of Commons
Melvin Steinberg (born 1933), American politician, Lieutenant Governor of Maryland from 1987 to 1995

Sportsmen
Melvin Upton Jr. (born 1984), American baseball player
Melvin Baker (born 1950), American football player
Melvin Booker (born 1972), American basketball player
Melvin Brown (footballer) (born 1979), Mexican football player
Melvin Bullitt (born 1984), American football player
Melvin Cunningham (born 1973), American football player
Melvin Ely (born 1978), American basketball player
Melvin Fowler (born 1979), American football center
Melvin Guillard (born 1983), American mixed martial artist
Melvin Gordon American football player
Melvin Jones (American football) (born 1955), American football player
Melvin Manhoef (born 1976), Dutch kickboxer
Melvin Mora (born 1972), Major League baseball player
Melvin Nieves (born 1971), baseball player
Melvin Ott (1909–1958), Major League Baseball right fielder
Melvin Platje (born 1988), Dutch football player
Melvin Rosen (1928–2018), American track coach
Melvin Stewart (born 1968), American swimmer and Olympic medal winner
Melvin Tarley (born 1982), Liberian footballer
Melvin Turpin (1960–2010), American basketball player
Melvin Valladares (born 1984), Honduran football striker
Melvin Wandelaar (born 1990), Dutch footballer
Melvin Watkins (born 1954), American basketball coach

Writers

Melvin Burgess (born 1954), British author of children's fiction
Melvin Frank (1913–1988), American screenwriter and film director
Melvin B. Tolson (1898–1966), American modernist poet

Others

Melvin Belli (1907–1996), American lawyer known as 'The King of Torts'
Melvin Bernhardt (1931-2015), American stage and television director
Melvin Dummar (1944–2018), American hoaxer and subject of film Melvin and Howard
Melvin N. Johnson, American academic administrator
Melvin Purvis (1903–1960), American FBI agent
Melvin Williams (disambiguation), multiple people
Melvin Zais (1916–1981), United States Army general

Fictional characters

Melvin "Big Smoke" Harris, in the video game Grand Theft Auto: San Andreas
Melvin Frohike, in the television shows The X-Files and The Lone Gunmen
Melvin Palmer, on the television show Boston Legal
Melvin the Superhero Guy, a puppet of ventriloquist Jeff Dunham
Melvin Sneedly, a character from the Captain Underpants series

Surname 

 Allan Melvin (1923–2008), American actor
 Billy Melvin (born 1977), Scottish footballer
 Bob Melvin (born 1961), American baseball player and manager
 Charles Melvin (1885–1941) British soldier and Victoria Cross recipient
 Chasity Melvin (born 1976), American basketball player
 Craig Melvin (born 1979), American journalist
 Doug Melvin (born 1952), Canadian baseball executive
 Doug Melvin (rower) (1928–2021), British rower
 Ed Melvin (1916–2004), American basketball player
 Eileen Melvin, American businessperson
 Eric Melvin (born 1966), American musician
 Fordyce R. Melvin (1832–1915), American politician
 G. S. Melvin (1886–1946), British pantomime dame and comedian
 Henry A. Melvin (1865–1920), American judge
 Isaac Melvin (1811–1853), American architect
 Jemma Melvin, British pudding creator
 Jerry G. Melvin (1929–2020), American politician
 Joan Orie Melvin, American judge
 Joe Melvin (1853–1909), Australian journalist
 John Melvin, multiple people
 Kenneth R. Melvin (born 1952), American politician and lawyer
 Leland D. Melvin (born 1964), American astronaut
 Martin Melvin (1879–1952), British businessman and newspaper manager
 Mekenna Melvin (born 1985), American actress
 Mungo Melvin (born 1955), British soldier and historian
 Murray Melvin (born 1932), English stage and film actor
 Norman C. Melvin III (born 1950), American botanist and plant ecologist
 Peter Melvin (1933–2009), British architect
 Rachel Melvin (born 1985), American actress
 Rashaan Melvin (born 1989), American football player
 Randy Melvin (born 1959), American football coach
 Reine Arcache Melvin (born 1959), Filipina author
 Sean Melvin (born 1994), Canadian soccer player
 Thayer Melvin (1835–1906), American lawyer, politician, and judge
 Theodore N. Melvin (1846–1897), American lawyer and politician
 Tom Melvin (born 1961), American football coach
 William L. Melvin, American engineer

See also
 Melvyn, a list of people with the given name
Justice Melvin (disambiguation)

References

Masculine given names
English masculine given names
English-language masculine given names
French masculine given names
German masculine given names
Dutch masculine given names